James Patrick Sinnott Devereux (February 20, 1903 – August 5, 1988) was a United States Marine Corps general, Navy Cross recipient, and Republican congressman. He was the officer-in-charge (OIC) of the 1st Defense Battalion Detachment during the defense of Wake Island in December 1941. He was captured on Wake Island as a prisoner of war, along with his men, after a 15-day battle with the Japanese. After his release in September 1945, he concluded his military career as a colonel in 1948, where upon his retirement he was promoted to brigadier general. He later represented the second congressional district of the state of Maryland in the United States House of Representatives for four terms from 1951 to 1959.  He was an unsuccessful candidate for election as Governor of Maryland in 1958.

Biography

Early life
Devereux was born in Cabana, Cuba, where his father, a U.S. Army surgeon, was stationed. In 1910, the family moved to Chevy Chase, Maryland, on the north border of the District of Columbia with Washington, D.C. There, Devereux, one of ten children, rode to hounds in Rock Creek Park and played polo. At age 10 he obtained a driver's license from the District of Columbia, which had no age requirement at the time.

Devereux also attended the Army and Navy Preparatory School in Washington, D.C., then the Tome School overlooking the Susquehanna River at Port Deposit, Maryland, LaVilla in Lausanne, Switzerland (when his parents lived in Vienna, Austria), and later Loyola College of Baltimore, a Jesuit Roman Catholic institution in  Maryland.

Marine Corps career
Devereux enlisted in the United States Marine Corps in July 1923 at age 20, was commissioned a second lieutenant in February 1925, and then was assigned to duty in Norfolk, Virginia, Philadelphia, Pennsylvania, the Marine barracks at Quantico, Virginia, and at Guantanamo Bay, Cuba. In 1926, he was detailed to the mail guard detachment in New York City and later was transferred to the force of Marines then serving in Nicaragua as a company officer.

Returning to the United States early in 1927, he was assigned to the USS Utah and subsequently was transferred ashore again to Nicaragua. Shortly thereafter he was ordered to the Orient and while in China was promoted to first lieutenant. Other duty in China included command of the Mounted Detachment of the U.S. Legation Guard at Peking.

In 1933, following a year's tour of duty at Quantico, he was assigned to the Coast Artillery School at Fort Monroe, Virginia. Following his promotion to captain in December 1935, he was ordered back to Quantico, where, until 1936, he instructed in the Base Defense Weapons School and aided in the preparation of a Marine Corps manual on Base Defense Weapons.

In 1938, following a tour of duty with the Marine detachment on board the USS Utah, Devereux was transferred to the Marine Corps Base at San Diego.

Defense of Wake Island

In January 1941, Devereux was ordered to Pearl Harbor in the Hawaiian Islands and later dispatched to Wake Island as the officer-in-charge of the First Marine Defense Battalion's Detachment on Wake Island, located in the northwest Pacific Ocean.  On the morning of Monday, December 8, 1941, he received the message that Pearl Harbor had been attacked by the Japanese a few hours earlier (Sunday, December 7, 1941).  In the fight that followed, (the Battle of Wake Island) then-Major Devereux, and his Marines, supported by Marine Fighter Squadron 211, damaged two cruisers, sank two destroyers, one escort vessel, and destroyed or damaged a total of 72 aircraft, and probably sank one submarine.  Two more destroyers were damaged the last day.  However, later, after a second more intensive larger invasion force attacked, after days of bitter fighting, the 449 Marines surrendered to the Japanese on December 23, 1941.

Prisoner of war
 
After his capture, he remained on Wake Island until January 12, 1942, when he was sent away with his men on the Nita Maru.  He stopped at Yokohama, where some American officers debarked, but later arrived at Woosung, China, located downriver from Shanghai, on January, 24.  He remained there until December 9, 1942, when he was transferred to Kiangwan, where he spent 29 months imprisoned.  For five weeks, he stayed at Fungtai, near Peiping, and then was transferred to camps in central Hokkaidō, northern island of Japan.

Devereux was released from the Hokkaidō Island prison camp on September 15, 1945.

After World War II
After a brief rehabilitation leave, he was assigned as a student in the Senior Course at the Amphibious Warfare School at Quantico from September 1946 to May 1947.  Upon completion of his studies, he was detached to the First Marine Division at Camp Pendleton, Oceanside, California, and was serving with that organization when he concluded his 25-year career on August 1, 1948.  In 1947, his book, Story of Wake Island, was published.

Devereux was advanced to the rank of brigadier general upon retirement in accordance with law, having been specially commended for the performance of duty in actual combat.  For his leadership in defending the tiny American outpost for 15 days against overwhelming odds, Devereux was awarded the Navy Cross. His citation reads:

Awards and decorations
BGen Devereux's awards include: 

Devereux became eligible for the Prisoner of War Service Medal when it was authorized on November 8, 1985.

Post-military career – farming, Congress, public safety
Devereux took up horse farming – with a farm near Glyndon, Maryland, in suburban Baltimore County; and following his retirement from the Marine Corps, Devereux moved to a  farm at Stevenson, Maryland.

In 1950, Devereux was elected as a Republican to the U.S. Congress for Maryland's 2nd Congressional District by defeating incumbent Democratic Rep. William P. Bolton. Devereux would serve four terms in the U.S. House of Representatives from January 3, 1951, to January 3, 1959.  During his Congressional career, he supported public school desegregation and ending racial discrimination in employment. He served on the House Armed Services Committee from July 3, 1952 (replacing John Anderson (R-Calif.)) until he left Congress. Devereaux did not sign the 1956 Southern Manifesto and voted in favor of the Civil Rights Act of 1957. He was not a candidate for renomination in 1958, but was an unsuccessful candidate for election as Governor of Maryland against Democrat J. Millard Tawes from Crisfield on Maryland's lower Eastern Shore of the Chesapeake Bay. In 1960, he was named Republican Party chairman in his congressional district.

He later served as director of public safety for Baltimore County, Maryland, from December 1962 to 1966, supervising the police and fire departments.

He was a member of the Sons of the American Revolution.

He was resident of Ruxton, Maryland, until his death.

Family
While stationed in the Philippines, Devereux met Mary Brush Welch, the daughter of an American missionary.  They were married in 1932.  They had one son and one daughter who died at birth (1934).  Mrs. Devereux died of complications from diabetes in 1942, shortly after his capture by the Japanese on Wake Island.  She was buried in Arlington National Cemetery.  In 1946, he married Rachel Clarke Cooke and they had two sons. The second Mrs. Devereux died in 1977. He married a third time, to Edna Burnside Howard – in 1978, gaining a stepson and three stepdaughters. His sister, Margaret, married Brigadier General Richard H. Jeschke, USMC.

Death and burial
Brigadier General Devereux died at age 85 in Stella Maris Hospice in the county seat of Towson, Maryland, just north of Baltimore on August 5, 1988, from pneumonia. He is interred in Arlington National Cemetery in northern Virginia overlooking the Potomac River.

Electoral history

Notes

References

This article incorporates text in the public domain from the U.S. Government.
 Retrieved on 2008-02-07
 
 Eugene L. Meyer, "A Hero's Welcome", Bethesda Magazine, July/August 2007

Further reading
 
 

1903 births
1988 deaths
United States Marine Corps personnel of World War II
American expatriates in Cuba
American prisoners of war in World War II
Recipients of the Navy Cross (United States)
People from Chevy Chase, Maryland
United States Marine Corps generals
World War II prisoners of war held by Japan
Burials at Arlington National Cemetery
Battle of Wake Island
American military writers
American politicians of Cuban descent
Republican Party members of the United States House of Representatives from Maryland
Military personnel from Maryland
People from Ruxton-Riderwood, Maryland
People from Port Deposit, Maryland
20th-century American writers
20th-century American politicians